The Pyongyang–Sinŭiju Motorway is a motorway in North Korea under construction, which will be built parallel to the Pyongyang–Sinŭiju line and will connect Pyongyang with Sinŭiju. The Chinese border city  Dandong is to be reached via Sino-Korean Friendship Bridge. The Pyongyang–Sinŭiju Expressway is said to be 387.1 kilometers long.

Construction 
Construction started in 2010. It is not known when the route will be completed. The lanes for the two directions of travel should not be separated in the middle by green strips or guardrails. At the same time, the Sinŭiju–Kaesŏng high-speed railway is to be built, designed for a maximum speed of 200 km/h. When completed, it closes a gap in Asian Highway 1.

Buildings 
A total of 19 toll booths, 12 rest stops and 77 bridges will be built.

References

Roads in North Korea
AH1